The Biomedical Informatics Research Network, commonly referred among analysts as “BIRN” is a national proposed project to assist biomedical researchers in their bioscience investigations through data sharing and online collaborations. BIRN provides data-sharing infrastructure, advisory services from a single source and software tools and techniques. This national initiative is funded by NIH Grants, the National Center for Research Resources and the National Institute of General Medical Sciences (NIGMS), a component of the United States National Institutes of Health (NIH).

Overview
To serve the Biomedical community, BIRN is designed to share significant and intensive data between researchers across geographic distance using user driven base software. Participants can transfer data securely and privately, internal and external. All data transfer is designed to be consistent with Health Insurance Portability and Accountability Act of 1996 (HIPAA)  privacy and security guidelines.

BIRN also offers documented best practices, expert advice, data-sharing, and query and analysis software tools specific to biomedical research. Its researchers develop authorization capabilities and new data-sharing and engineering tools to assist researchers in making sense of new information.

Structure
BIRN is a collaborative effort between the NIGMS and a variety of nationwide leadership associations: Information Sciences Institute (ISI) at the University of Southern California, University of Chicago, Massachusetts General Hospital, University of California at Irvine, and the University of California at Los Angeles.

Its interdisciplinary team consists of computer scientists, engineers, physicians, biomedical researchers and other technical experts, including grid computing developers Carl Kesselman of USC ISI, and Ian Foster of Argonne National Laboratories. Co-Principal Investigators are:
 Carl Kesselman, Ph.D., a professor in the University of Southern California (USC) Daniel J. Epstein Department of Industrial and Systems Engineering, and a Fellow of the Information Sciences Institute (ISI), its highest honor;
 Ian Foster, Ph.D., director of the Computation Institute, a joint project between the University of Chicago and Argonne National Laboratory, and associate director of Argonne's Mathematics and Computer Science Division;
 Steven G. Potkin, M.D., a professor in the Department of Psychiatry and Human Behavior at the University of California at Irvine (UCI) and Director of UCI's Brain Imaging Center;
 Bruce R. Rosen, M.D., Ph.D., a professor of radiology at Harvard Medical School and Health Sciences and Technology at the Harvard-MIT Division of Health Sciences and Technology, and Director of the Athinoula A. Martinos Center for Biomedical Imaging at the Massachusetts General Hospital in Boston, MA;
 Jonathan C. Silverstein, M.D., associate director and senior fellow at the University of Chicago-Argonne National Laboratory Computation Institute, and an associate professor of Surgery, Radiology and Biological Sciences at UC;
 Arthur Toga, Ph.D., a professor in the University of Southern California.

Resources 
Users range from small research groups to larger researching groups. Like the National consortias such as the Nonhuman Primate Research Consortium (NHPRC) and the Cardiovascular Research Grid (CVRG), both funded by NIH.

By using BIRN's capabilities both to access data and perform research, groups can conduct large-scale data analysis while maximizing their existing technical infrastructure and expertise. Users also can participate in BIRN Working Groups that develop and support key functions, operations, security and data-sharing requirements.

BIRN offers a website, wiki and mailing lists to help users stay current on up to date news and information. The best practices and topics related directly to their data-sharing considerations. Its experts can help biomedical teams select software, data and metadata community standards; set up security mechanisms and sharing protocols to create multi-institutional policies from a potentially overwhelming range of options.

History
BIRN was initially built around several “testbeds” or selected projects in neurology research and begun as an NCRR initiative. In 2008, its software expanded significantly to including data-sharing support across the entire biomedical research community. The network, being now open to all biomedical research groups is In belief that BIRN will benefit from its services, regardless of a group's specialty, mandate, size or U.S. location.

BIRN's mission also has shifted from having a central place for data to a means of supporting efficient data transfer. As a result, BIRN no longer provides hardware, offers or maintain servers (previously called “racks”) for storing user information, or uses participants’ computers as network interchange.

The user-driven, software-based approach instead supports data sharing on participants’ existing hardware and software. Each user group retains control over, and responsibility for, its own hardware—and for the security and privacy of its own information. Data is stored on users' systems rather than in a central repository, making possible storage of, and access to, vastly greater data quantities than was possible with BIRN “racks” alone.

Membership
To become members, groups begin by filling out a contact form on the BIRN website. A BIRN team member responds, and if its services appear to be a good match, s/he typically refers questioners to a BIRN member or WG for more in-depth conversations.

BIRN seeks to aid universities and institutional based researchers with complex, distributed projects, technologically or geographically. Such as multi-site clinical trials.

Working Groups (WGs) evaluate candidate projects based on their unique characteristics and use cases. There are no specific project criteria or required sizes, although WGs may consider factors such as research goals, potential impact, technical challenges, host institution and sponsor funding.

WGs typically discuss whether BIRN's capabilities will address the group's data usage requirements, which BIRN tools and areas of expertise would fit best, and related issues. BIRN strongly encourages inquiries from biomedical research groups nationwide.

Among the characteristics of groups likely to get the most out of BIRN: the need to exchange data between multiple sites on an ongoing basis, not just from one site to another or for a one-time-only project, and/or to make data from multiple sites publicly available.

On a social level, BIRN looks for groups that understand users’ data-sharing problems and can articulate how those issues affect them in day-to-day, real-world ways. Groups aren't expected to be technical wizards, but do need to be able to articulate specific data-sharing needs and problems.

BIRN contributes technical expertise, while users provide the knowledge specific to their fields. For instance, BIRN can advise on how to go about defining user needs and requirements, but only users can determine specifically what those factors should be. Because BIRN isn't a plug-and-play, off-the-shelf product, the network seeks prospective users who are committed to conceiving, designing, building and implementing the best solution for their circumstances.

References

External links
 BIRN community website
 BIRN community overview
 BIRN community frequently asked questions

National Institutes of Health
Neuroimaging
Bioinformatics organizations